Percy William David Izzard  (September 1877 – 17 June 1968) was the well-known gardening correspondent on the Daily Mail newspaper and author of several books on gardening.

Life and works 
Percy Izzard was the first regular agricultural and horticultural correspondent in the popular press and wrote for the Daily Mail for a period of 50 years. He was noted for his book Homeland: A Year of Country Days, a collection of 365 of his "Country Diary" columns from the Daily Mail, with black-and-white illustrations by his wife Florence Louise Izzard and Will G. Mein. He was claimed by his son, the writer Ralph Izzard, to have been the inspiration for William Boot in the Evelyn Waugh novel "Scoop".
He was an authority on roses and the Percy Izzard rose was named for him.

Notable works 
Homeland: A Year of Country Days (1918)
 Daily Mail Garden Plans (1929)
 Breeds of British Poultry (1933)
 Grow it Yourself: Daily Mail Practical Instruction Book on Food from the Garden in War-Time (1940)

References

1877 births
1968 deaths
English gardeners
British garden writers
English rose horticulturists
Daily Mail journalists
Officers of the Order of the British Empire